KDX-IIA is an Aegis Combat System armed variant of the KDX-II,  of the Republic of Korea Navy (ROKN). As of 2011 ROKN planned to build at least 6 ships of this class with a proposed displacement of 5500 ~ 7500 tons over the 2019 to 2026 time frame. It is the final part of the Korean Destroyer eXperimental program. Although the South Korean government has not released detailed documents about this class, it is likely to use stealth technology like KDX-II as well as having a more integrated sonar and better data link capabilities. All of these improvements are expected to enhance littoral combat as well as blue-water capabilities.

The ROKN expects it to make up a major part of the fleet. Each unit will cost around $500~$700 million.

See also
Aegis Combat System
Korean Destroyer eXperimental
Republic of Korea Navy
KDX-II

External links 

Destroyers of the Republic of Korea Navy
Proposed ships